Gatlukay is a rural locality (an aul) in Adygeysk District of Adygea, Russia. The population was 1555 as of 2018. There are 15 streets.

Geography 
Gatlukay is located 6 km east of Adygeysk (the district's administrative centre) by road. Pchegatlukay is the nearest rural locality.

Ethnicity 
The aul is inhabited by Circassians.

References 

Rural localities in Adygea District